The 1929 state election in Queensland, Australia was held on 11 May 1929.

By-elections

 On 6 August 1927, Samuel Brassington (Labor) was elected to succeed Edward Land (Labor), who had died on 2 May 1927, as the member for Balonne.
 On 25 February 1928, Ernest Grimstone (CPNP) was elected to succeed Frederick Nott (CPNP), who had died on 5 December 1927, as the member for Stanley.
 On 26 May 1928, Richard Bow (Labor) was elected to succeed John Payne (Labor), who had died on 24 January 1928, as the member for Mitchell.
 On 13 October 1928, Robert Boyd (CPNP) was elected to succeed Bernard Corser (CPNP), who had resigned on 16 August 1928, as the member for Burnett.

Retiring Members
CPNP Albert MLA John Appel died prior to the election; no by-election was held.

No members retired at this election.

Candidates
Sitting members at the time of the election are shown in bold text.

See also
 1929 Queensland state election
 Members of the Queensland Legislative Assembly, 1926–1929
 Members of the Queensland Legislative Assembly, 1929–1932
 List of political parties in Australia

References
 

Candidates for Queensland state elections